Maccabi Haifa Football Club (Moadon HaKaduregel Maccabi Haifa) is an Israeli professional football club, based in the city of Haifa, Israel, a section of Maccabi Haifa sports club. The club plays in the Israeli Premier League. Maccabi Haifa home games are played at Sammy Ofer Stadium. The stadium, which is shared with rivals Hapoel Haifa, is the second largest in Israeli football, with a capacity of 30,858.

Maccabi Haifa is one of the "Big Four" clubs in Israeli football. The meaning of the name Maccabi – 'there is no one like you among the gods' – also refers to the Star of David in the team's logo. The side has won fourteen league titles, six State Cups and five Toto Cups. Maccabi Haifa has won the championship and the cup in the same season (referred to as winning the "double") once, and was the first Israeli club to qualify for the group stage of the UEFA Champions League, in the 2002–03 UEFA Champions League season. Maccabi Haifa holds the record, for the most Champions League group stage qualifications for an Israeli team in three occasions. In 2020–21, Maccabi Haifa won the Israeli Premier League, their first championship in a decade.

Maccabi Haifa is currently coached by Barak Bakhar, who joined the team after several successful seasons with Hapoel Be'er Sheva and has gone on to guide the club to back-to-back league titles along with qualification for the Champions League group stages in 2022.

History

Early years
Maccabi Haifa Football Club was established in 1913 in the port city of Haifa in the Mutasarrifate of Jerusalem (present-day Israel). As the local football association wasn't founded in Mandatory Palestine until July 1928, there were no officially organized competitions during the season, and the club played only friendly matches.

After a period of inactivity, the club was re-organized in February 1923. The club playing a handful of matches during the season, including taking part in a cup competition which was called "The Hebrew Cup". Due to its distance, the club was given a bye to the final, which it lost to Maccabi Nes Tziona 0–2.

The club was overshadowed by its city rival Hapoel Haifa, but even in its first years adopted a very adventurous and offensive style of play based on technique and short passes.

In 1942, the club reached the Israel State Cup final, but was defeated 12–1 by Beitar Tel Aviv in the final.
 
Maccabi Haifa remained a small, struggling club that spent most of its time shifting between Liga Leumit and the lower leagues.

In 1962, the team defeated Maccabi Tel Aviv 5–2 in the State Cup final, and won the first title of the club. In 1963 it reached the final again, but lost to Hapoel Haifa 1–0 in the first Haifa derby in State Cup final.

The 1980s
In the 1980s Maccabi Haifa finally entered the 'Israeli' champions' club, clinching the title thrice (in 1983–84, 1984–85 and 1988–89 seasons).

In the 1983–84 season Maccabi Haifa won its first ever championship, under coach Shlomo Sharf and general manager Yochanan Vollach, overcoming Beitar Jerusalem and Hapoel Tel Aviv. The Yerukim (Greens) were known for their "all-around-offense" and flashy technique football style, often resulting in bad defensive formation and resultant losses.

Sharf's team played with 4 strikers, including: Moshe Selecter, Zahi Armeli and Ronny Rosenthal who were positioned at point and midfield and managed to build their defense around the legendary goalkeeper Avi Ran.

A year later, Maccabi Haifa won a second championship in a decisive performance. In 1986 Maccabi Haifa lost the championship in a controversial final match against runners-up Hapoel Tel Aviv. The single goal scored in that match by Gili Landau was said to be scored from a passive offside position, which by the rules of the time should have resulted in a disqualification of the goal and a scoreless draw, guaranteeing Maccabi Haifa the title. Due to poor TV coverage, the issue has never been resolved.

In 1988, Maccabi Haifa decimated Maccabi Tel Aviv 10–0 to earn its biggest win ever. That game, one of the more famous in Israeli's football lore, wasn't even televised. Furthermore, it probably was the beginning of the intense rivalry between the two clubs. In 1989, under the capable hands of Amazzia Levkovic, the club won another championship.

The 1990s

In the 1990s Maccabi Haifa established itself as a dominant club in Israel. It began by winning the Double – League championship and the national cup in the 1990–1 season and continued with the introduction of three talented young players: Eyal Berkovic, Reuven Atar and Tal Banin.

In 1992, Maccabi Haifa was purchased by Ya'akov Shahar, who became the owner and president of the club. Under Shahar's management, Maccabi Haifa enjoyed financial stability and professional working regulations on a par with European football clubs' standards. Maccabi Haifa's highlight season was 1993–94. After winning the 1993 cup, Maccabi Haifa gave a stunning performance in the UEFA Cup Winners' Cup (CWC), beating Torpedo Moscow 3–1 and Parma 1–0 in the last 16, only to lose on penalties. During the season in the domestic league (then called Liga Leumit), the team became the first and only in israeli football history to go unbeaten for the entire season, with an overall unbeaten streak of 48 games, thus winning a spectacular championship, and breaking many Israeli records. The Maccabi Haifa 1993–94 squad including Eyal Berkovic, Reuven Atar, Alon Mizrahi and Serhiy Kandaurov, and is considered one of, if not the best squads in Israeli football history.

In 1995, Maccabi Haifa begun a period of seven years without winning the league championship, and most of its popular soccer superstar were sold to Europe. In 1996, Eyal Berkovic and Haim Revivo, the latter had joined the team the previous season, both left Haifa for European clubs. While the two gained great personal success there, Maccabi Haifa went into a slump. The team's standards of maintaining the services of the manager for multiple seasons was thrown as the team went through several managers during 4 years. As result, the team failed to win the national championship title, despite securing the National cup in 1998.

In 1999, under the guidance of the Czech manager Dušan Uhrin, Maccabi Haifa beat French giants Paris Saint-Germain and Austrian club SV Ried to reach the quarter-final of the Cup Winners' Cup. In the middle of the season, Haifa's excellent striker Alon Mizrahi left for French club Nice resulting in a defeat in the CWC quarter-final and a slump in the club's league performance. The club's winning record continued to falter until the arrival of Avram Grant.

2000 and beyond

Former Maccabi Tel Aviv Manager Avram Grant was appointed in 2000 as manager of Maccabi Haifa. Under Grant's guidance, the team regained its dominating offensive style. Grant, along with a much improved squad, led the club with an almost unstoppable team, winning the championship. At the center of attention were a series of virtuoso performances by Yossi Benayoun, including what some consider to be several of the finest goals in Israeli league history. A spontaneous burst of celebrating fans onto the pitch caused a tragic disaster. A young fan, Amir Rand, was crushed against the guarding rails and left comatose.

A year later, Grant won a second championship, relying on a veteran Israeli defense: Alon Harazi, Arik Benado and Adoram Keise, and on a trio of foreign footballers: Giovanni Rosso (Croatia), Raimondas Žutautas (Lithuania) and the young Nigerian striker Yakubu. Following the 2nd championship, Avraham Grant left Haifa for the Israeli national team and was replaced by then Israel U-21 manager Itzhak Shum.

In 2002, Haifa made Israeli club history by becoming the first Israeli team to qualify for the group phase of the UEFA Champions League. In the group phase, the team defeated Olympiacos and Manchester United. Haifa managed 7 points overall scoring 12 goals, and finished in 3rd place, securing a place in the UEFA Cup.

In the 2003–04 season Maccabi Haifa, led by ex-Maccabi Haifa footballer Ronny Levy, won the championship mainly due to the poor showing of the other league teams.
Maccabi Haifa youth club (ages 16–18) won the domestic championship, and an Israel national kids team of Maccabi Haifa players won Fox Kids World Cup for 12-year-olds.

History was made during the 2005–06 season. After months of indecision regarding the contract of Ronny Levy, it was renewed and Levy guided the club to 11 straight victories in the first 11 games of the Israeli Premier League season. This was also the key to Maccabi Haifa taking the league title after building a strong lead. While the club enjoyed great domestic success, it was not as fortunate in European play. Though Haifa was a seeded team for the UEFA Champions League second qualifying round, it drew the strong Swedish club, Malmö FF. Haifa lost 3–2 in Sweden, and drew 2–2 at home.

In the 2006–07 season, the club played against Liverpool.
In the 1st game of the 3rd round of the qualifying matches held in England, Haifa's Gustavo Boccoli scored on the 29th minute, an advantage that lasted just 4 minutes. Craig Bellamy evened the score and in front of 40,000 local fans, Haifa stood bravely up to the 88th minute when Mark Gonzales scored the winning goal for the hosts. Due to the security situation in Israel, the return match was not held in Ramat Gan but in Kyiv, Ukraine, at the Valery Lobanovsky stadium, with 1,700 spectators. The game ended in a 1–1 tie. The last twenty minutes of the game were stressful for Rafa Benitez's players. Indeed, the giant Peter Crouch gave his team the advantage (54) and an away goal, but Roberto Colautti (63) tied the score and from here on the movement towards the host's goalpost became one-sided. The tie score sent Haifa to compete in the UEFA Cup.

In the return match in Bulgaria against Litex Lovech, Haifa played well: Xavier Dirceu scored an impressive goal from distance, Alain Masudi and Roberto Colautti left Eljendario Sanderinio one honor goal. In the group stage, Haifa faced strong opponents: The Scottish Rangers, the Serbian Partizan Belgrade, the French Auxerre and the Italian Serie A team Livorno. In the 88th minute, the Scots succeeded in doubling the score from another penalty kick given away by a Haifa defender. This time Charlie Adam scored and sealed the victory. Haifa returned home and hosted Partizan Belgrade. An early goal by Anderson Xavier, the Brazilian midfielder, put Haifa in an excellent place with six points. Haifa needed one point in the away game in Italy against Livorno to complete the task successfully. At this stage Haifa was drawn against CSKA Moscow. The game was moved to the Spartak stadium in Vladikavkaz due to extreme weather in Moscow. 30,000 Russian fans crowded the stadium. Torpedo beat Haifa 1–0 and Lokomotiv beat it 3–0. Again Haifa did not score an away goal, but the result (0–0) signaled that Haifa might use its home advantage in the return match.

In the 2007–08 season, Maccabi Haifa finished 5th place in the league and was eliminated in the last-16 phase of the State Cup. Ronny Levy announced that he was leaving. Haifa won the Toto Cup after a 2–0 victory over Bnei-Sakhnin.

Haifa opened the 2008–09 season with hopes of remaining a top team. At the end of the season, coach Elisha Levy won his first personal title and Haifa made Israeli soccer history, winning six championships in one decade.

Maccabi Haifa returned to the Champions League for the 2009–10 season. A 3–0 win over FC Red Bull Salzburg ensured its second win in the span of seven years, with goals by Dvalishvili, Golasa and Ghadir. Haifa entered the 2009–10 Champions League group stage in Group A, competing against Bayern Munich, Juventus and Bordeaux. Haifa finished the competition with a record of 6 losses, conceding 8 goals and without scoring. The club subsequently lost the championship title to Hapoel Tel Aviv on the last day of the season.

In the 2010–11 Israeli Premier League season, Maccabi Haifa has won the Israeli Championship title but lost the chance to achieve the Double by losing to rivals Hapoel Tel Aviv in the State Cup final.

The 2011–12 season was a disappointing one. After winning the League title in the previous season, the team started the season with qualification
matches in the UEFA Champions League, but eliminated after a penalty defeat to the Belgian club Genk.
Domestically, it was another disappointment. Maccabi Haifa struggled for the European football spot, and a draw
in the last round wasn't enough, as Maccabi Haifa finished in a disappointing 5th place.
Another failure was at the State Cup as the team lost in the Final to rivals Hapoel Tel Aviv from a controversial 93rd-minute goal.
The disappointing season caused owner Ya'akov Shahar to appoint former player and club icon Reuven Atar as the manager for the next season instead of Elisha Levi, who left the club after clinching 2 championship titles in 4 years with the club.

With Reuven Atar on the sidelines, Haifa opened the season with 1 win, 4 draws, and 4 losses and was next to last, the worst start in club history. After the 9th round, Atar was fired and replaced by Arik Benado, the youth team coach and former team captain. Under Benado, Haifa returned to the top of the table and showed good performances during the season. Haifa gave fight to Maccabi Tel Aviv but finished 2nd.

On 25 July 2013, Maccabi Haifa defeated Xazar Lankaran 8–0 in the 2nd qualifying round of UEFA Europa League. thus setting a new record for the largest win by an Israeli club in European competition.

On 24 May 2016, Maccabi Haifa defeated Maccabi Tel Aviv 1–0 in the Israel State Cup Final, winning for the 1st time in 18 years and, thus, returning to European competition after 3 years.

On 30 May 2021, after 10 long tough years full of disappointments for the club and its fans,  Maccabi Haifa has won the Israeli Premier league championship, defeating Hapoel Be'er Sheva 3-2. Haifa's players Josh Cohen, Neta Lavi and Dolev Haziza won the league MVP titles, awarded by 3 major israeli football organizations. The team's coach, Barak Bakhar, won the "Coach of the year" title Unequivocally.

Sponsorships, fan base and rivalries

The club is sponsored by Ya'akov Shahar, chairman of Mayer's Cars and Trucks Ltd., the official importer to Israel of Volvo and Honda. The fan base is mainly in Haifa and northern Israel, although the club is one of the most popular in Israel. Average attendance in the home matches since the move to Sammy Ofer Stadium in 2015 is approximately 24,000 fans, the most in Israel.
According to a survey which had been conducted in 2010, Maccabi Haifa has the biggest number of fans of all the teams in Israel, approximately 25.8% of Israeli football fans. 2

On 30 June 2011, a Haaretz poll identified Maccabi Haifa as the most popular football team among Arab citizens of Israel.

Another survey had been conducted in March 2012 by Yedioth confirmed that Maccabi Haifa is the most popular team among Israeli football fans (28%), female football fans (33%) and Arab citizens of Israel. Same survey revealed that 75% of Haifa residents support the team.

Historically, the block group encourages fans were home games Kiryat Eliezer Stadium stands 11–12 called also Yetzia Gimel (יציע ג') – C Block – which has become synonymous with the hardcore and dedicated fans.

In 1994, Uzi Hitman composed and wrote the team's championship song titled "Green in the eyes" (ירוק בעיניים) and gave it to Haim Moshe, the song was a major hit amongst the club's fanbase and was later coved by Eden Ben Zaken in 2021 once again as a championship song. In 2004, following Hitman's death, a minute of silence was given to Hitman during a match against Bnei Yehuda Tel Aviv, which was followed by supporters singing the chorus of the famous championship song.

In 2002, The fans established an organization named Green Apes, which supports both soccer and basketball. Members usually sit in the bleachers section 11.

In addition, Maccabi Haifa has an official fan club which was founded in the first decade of the 21st century, and has about 20,000 members. The club is also supported overseas and is able to keep in touch with supporters overseas via the club website and online store.

At the 2008–09 Championship season the Maccabi Haifa audiences won the title of Fair Audience of the Year.

In 2010, another organization of fans was established for Maccabi Haifa, and named Inferno Verde, whose members sit in the stands section 5a. The organization's goal is not to outdo the Green Apes, but rather to join forces for victories and championships of the team.

Maccabi Haifa supporters have friendly relations with supporters of other clubs: Green Apes are in good relations with AZ Alkmaar's Alkmaar Fanatics and Ultra Boys Haifa are in good relations with Werder Bremen's Ultra Boys

Number of surveys made during the first decade of the 21st century found that Maccabi Haifa is Israel's most favorite team.

At the beginning of the 21st century the club website was upgraded, at Walla!. The edits were made by the historian of the club, Isaac Haverman, and include breaking news, articles, information about the club, officials, staff, players and former players, information on past games, galleries, statistics, multi–seasonal Guinness Book of club and depth articles, some of which also include a unique research statistic, work of Haverman. The site also includes an online forum, online store and club fans.

Starting in 2011 Haifa operates an official Facebook page, which includes information, news, pictures, online ticketing- online and update time – real game results. The Facebook page has 83,000 registered fans. In February 2011, the club opened an official YouTube page, which puts up interviews of players and the coach before and after games. The club has uploaded about 373 movies and has approximately 3200 subscribers, and approximately 550,000 video views (as of May 2014).

City rivalry with Hapoel Haifa
For more information see: Haifa derby

The rivalry with Maccabi Tel Aviv

The strong rivalry between the two Israeli football clubs (sometimes called “the Israeli Classico” and “the derby of Israel”) is about the dominance among the various Maccabi football clubs, as well as in Israeli football in general, and the title of the best football club in Israel.

Maccabi Haifa aspires to oust Maccabi Tel Aviv from this position, which is the club with the largest number of titles in Israel, and to become the leading club in Israel by winning many titles and qualifying for the European Cup stages (Cup Winners' Cup, UEFA Cup). Haifa and Tel Aviv have competed against each other for the championship title, and Haifa beat Maccabi Tel Aviv in a number of games, including a 10–0 win in 1988 - a game seen as a "revenge" for the loss of 2–10 in 1949 (another large defeat, at 0–7, took place in 1952). Haifa beat Tel Aviv 5–0 in the 1993–94 season (in which Haifa won the championship without a single defeat, but was eliminated from the State Cup competition three days later following Maccabi Tel Aviv's 1–1 draw at Kiryat Eliezer). Maccabi Haifa became dominant in the Israeli Premier League in the first decade of the 21st century, as Maccabi Tel Aviv's positions weakened (except for the 2002–03 season). The rivalry between them somewhat cooled down at the end of that decade due to the renewed rise of Hapoel Tel Aviv, which competed at the top of the table during this period and won several championship titles. The rivalry focus thus briefly shifted to Hapoel Tel Aviv.

In the 2019–20 season, the rivalry between the two heated up once again, as after almost a decade of Macabbi Tel Aviv success in oppose to Maccabi Haifa failure, the teams competed head-to-head for the championship. It ended with Maccabi Tel Aviv winning that year's campaign. In the following 2020–21 season, the two teams battled out for the league title once again, this time ending with Maccabi Haifa winning the championship. During the past few years, the two have produced some unforgettable matches, including a dramatic 4–3 win for Maccabi Tel Aviv and an incredible 3–2 win for Maccabi Haifa after a big comeback.

Club crest 
The origin of the club crest is the World Zionist sports organization "Maccabi". The basis of the crest is the stylized Hebrew word מכבי ("Maccabi") in the shape of the Star of David, symbolizing Judaism. This is in common with most other Maccabi teams in Israel and worldwide, which all use this symbol in one way or another. In most years only this stylized "Maccabi" star with the word חיפה ("Haifa") beneath it was the emblem of the club. Depending on the kit, it was green on white or white on green. With the success of the club at the end of the 1980s, an image of a lion was added next to the symbol, but this figure was removed later. At the beginning of the 1990s, after the club began competing in the European arena, the crest assumed its modern form - the image of a football inside a circular green band with the words מכבי חיפה מכ ("Maccabi Haifa FC") in Hebrew and English on it, with the original Maccabi symbol at the top right corner. At the end of 2005/2006 season, when the team won its 10th championship, a gold star was added above the symbol. At the end of the 2009 season winning its 11th championship, the team played its inaugural game with the traditional symbol of the club as it was in the early '80s. At the end of the 2013 season (on the 100th anniversary of the club's foundation), laurel leaves were temporarily added around the emblem, symbolizing victory and glory. In addition, a golden plaque was added indicating the year of the establishment of the club and the current year (100th club).
After the 2019/20 season, the Israel Football Association administration decided that each championship star on the member clubs' crests should represent 5 championship titles. Since Maccabi has won 12 championships in total until then, the crest was updated with another championship star.

Grounds

Kiryat Eliezer Stadium

Maccabi Haifa originally played in Kiryat Haim, which is the main training grounds of Hapoel Haifa. In 1955, a gift from the Italian Labour Union was a football pitch in the heart of the city of Haifa, which would become the new home of Maccabi Haifa. The opening match was a Haifa derby, won by Maccabi Haifa 4–1 over Hapoel Haifa.

Kiryat Eliezer missed out on staging a historic event when Maccabi Haifa reached the group stage of the UEFA Champions League. It was the first time an Israeli club had made it that far in the competition, though the lucrative gate receipts expected to have been made by hosting matches in Israel were lost when UEFA forced Maccabi Haifa to look for an alternative in Europe but outside of Israel because of security concerns. The choice was to host the matches at Neo GSP Stadium in Nicosia, Cyprus.
After Israel had increased the security and proved stability, Maccabi Haifa was allowed to play their European matches in the State of Israel. Because Kiryat Eliezer was not up to par with UEFA's demands, the team played their European home matches in Tel Aviv District at Bloomfield Stadium, as well as Ramat Gan Stadium due to the high demand of Maccabi Haifa fans wanting to attend the matches. Finally, Maccabi Haifa was allowed to host European matches at Kiryat Eliezer Stadium. In 2013, Maccabi Haifa played in the Europa League against PAOK (Greece), AZ Alkmaar (Netherlands), and Shakhter Karagandy (Kazakhstan).

On 14 May 2014, the last match was played in the stadium, in which Maccabi Haifa hosted Maccabi Tel Aviv in the Israeli Premier League.

Sammy Ofer Stadium

Due to the recent success of the club in European competitions, the municipality of Haifa offered the club land by the beach for a brand new stadium at the southern entrance to the city. In the fall of 2008, the final plans were approved. Sammy Ofer Stadium was completed in November 2013. Constructions costs are estimated $135,000,000.00 with a seating capacity of 30,858.
The stadium is named after naval-mogul Sammy Ofer, who donated $20,000,000 to build the stadium and the rights to name it after himself. The Sammy Ofer Stadium is developed and built by the Haifa Economic Corporation and managed by Adv. Gal Peleg. It is the home ground of Maccabi Haifa, Hapoel Haifa. It also hosts the international matches of the Israel national football team along with Teddy Stadium.

Kfar Galim Training Facility
Kfar Galim training facility is a training ground for Maccabi Haifa. It is located in Kfar Galim village.

Honours

Domestic competitions

League
 Israeli Championships
 Winners (14): 1983–84, 1984–85, 1988–89, 1990–91, 1993–94, 2000–01, 2001–02, 2003–04, 2004–05, 2005–06, 2008–09, 2010–11, 2020–21, 2021–22
 Runners-up (9): 1985–86, 1994–95, 1995–96, 1999–00, 2002–03, 2009–10, 2012–13, 2018–19, 2019–20
 Second Division
 Winners (4): 1944–45, 1946–47, 1965–66, 1974–75

Cups
 State Cup
 Winners (6): 1961–62, 1990–91, 1992–93, 1994–95, 1997–98, 2015–16
 Runners-up (11): 1942, 1962–63, 1970–71, 1984–85, 1986–87, 1988–89, 2001–02, 2008–09, 2010–11, 2011–12, 2021–22 
 Toto Cup
 Winners (5): 1994, 2002–03, 2005–06, 2007–08, 2021–22
 Israeli Supercup
 Winners (4): 1962, 1985, 1989, 2021

European competitions
 UEFA Champions League
 Group stage (3): 2002–03, 2009–10, 2022–23
 UEFA Cup/UEFA Europa League
 Round of 16 (1): 2006–07
 Group stage (2): 2011–12, 2013–14
 UEFA Europa Conference League
 Group stage (1): 2021-22
 UEFA Cup Winners Cup
 Quarter-finals (1): 1998–99
 Second round (1): 1993–94

Youth
 UEFA Youth League
 Play-offs: 2016–17
 Sukkot Cup
 Winners (1): 1958
 Lilian Cup
 Winners (1): 1984
 Milk Cup
 Winners (1): 2004
 Insel Cup
 Winners (1): 2016

Records and statistics
 Record home win: 10–0 v Maccabi Tel Aviv (1988)
 Record league defeat: 0–9 v Hapoel Petah Tikva (1953)
 Record cup defeat: 1–12 v Beitar Tel Aviv, Israel State Cup, Final (1942)
 Record home attendance: 39,120 v Juventus (2009)
 Most league appearances: 419 Alon Harazi
 Most appearances in one season: 66 Adoram Keise
 Most league goals: 90 Zahi Armeli
 Most league goals in a Season: 28 Alon Mizrahi (Liga Leumit, 1993–94) and Shlomi Arbeitman (2009–10)
 Most goals scored in a Match: 6 Aharon Gershgoren v Ironi Kiryat Shmona (1965)
 Most league goals in a Season: 97 (1993–94)
 Most points in a season: 95 – 39 games (1993–94)
 Most league assists in a season: 16 Eyal Berkovic (1993–94) and Yossi Benayoun (1999–00)
 Most Games without a loss: 46 (throughout 3 seasons) (1993, 1993–94, 1994)
 Most games in a row scoring at least one goal: 39 (1993–94)
 Most away games without losing: 30 (1993–94)
 Least conceded goals per game: 16 goals in 35 games (average: 0.46), Ligat Ha'Al (2009–10)

Players

Current squad
 As to 2 February 2023

Retired numbers

Out on loan

Foreigners 2022–23
Only up to six non-Israeli nationals can be in an Israeli club squad (only five can play at the same time). Those with Jewish ancestry (e.g., Josh Cohen), married to an Israeli (Mavis Tchibota) or have played in Israel for an extended period of time (Ali Mohamed), can claim a passport or permanent residency which would allow them to play with Israeli status.

  Pierre Cornud
  Dylan Batubinsika
  Frantzdy Pierrot
  Abdoulaye Seck
  Tjaronn Chery
  Daniel Sundgren

Captains
Neta Lavi, has been the captain since 2019.

Personnel

Current coaching staff

{|class="wikitable"
|+
! style="background-color:#FFFFFF; color:#000000;" scope="col"|Position
! style="background-color:#FFFFFF; color:#000000;" scope="col"|Staff
|-

Youth department

2022–23 squad

Current coaching staff
{|class="wikitable"
|+
! style="background-color:#FFFFFF; color:#000000;" scope="col"|Position
! style="background-color:#FFFFFF; color:#000000;" scope="col"|Staff
|-

Notable players and managers in club history

Former players
For details on former players, see List of Maccabi Haifa F.C. players and :Category:Maccabi Haifa F.C. players.

Most appearances

Managerial history
See also: List of Maccabi Haifa F.C. managers

  Yisrael Schwartz (1946–47)
  Taurentauer (1950–52)
  Otto Schlefenberg (1952–54)
  Eli Fuchs(1954–56)
  Andor Kisch (1956–57)
  Ariyeh Koch (1957–59)
  David Farkash (1959–61)
  Alex Forbes (1961–62)
  Andor Kisch (1962)
  Otto Schlefenberg (1962–63)
  Vasili Spasov (1963–65)
  Israel Halivner (1965)
  Avraham Menchel (1965–69)
  Edmond Schmilovich (1969–70)
  Jonny Hardy (1970–72)
  Avraham Menchel (1972–74)
  Ori Weinberg (1974–75)
  Shimon Shinar (1975–77)
  Moshe Sasson (1977)
  Eli Fuchs (1977)
  Jonny Hardy (1977–78)
  Eran Kulik (1978–79)
  Mordechai Spiegler (1979)
  Jonny Hardy (1979–83)
  Jack Mansell (1982–83)
  Shlomo Scharf (1983–87)
  Dror Kashtan (1 July 1987 – 30 June 1988)
  Amazzia Levkovic (1988–90)
  Shlomo Scharf (1990–92)
  Giora Spiegel (1993–98)
  Daniel Brailovsky (1 July 1998 – 30 June 1999)
  Dušan Uhrin (1999–00)
  Eli Cohen (2000)
  Avram Grant (1 July 2000 – 30 June 2002)
  Itzhak Shum (1 July 2002 – 30 June 2003)
  Ronny Levy (30 June 2003 – 22 December 2008)
  Elisha Levy (2 April 2008 – 16 May 2012)
  Reuven Atar (16 May 2012 – 13 November 2012)
  Arik Benado (17 November 2012 – 18 May 2014)
  Aleksandar Stanojević (1 July 2014 – 28 December 2014)
  Marco Balbul (28 December 2014 – 30 May 2015)
  Ronny Levy (30 May 2015 – 27 July 2016)
  Shmulik Hanin (caretaker) (28 July 2016 – 8 August 2016)
  René Meulensteen (9 August 2016 – 13 February 2017 )
  Guy Luzon (13 February 2017 – 9 December 2017 )	
  Fred Rutten (24 January 2018 – 1 November 2018)
  Eli Guttman (8 November 2018 – 3 December 2018)
  Marco Balbul (19 December 2018 – 7 July 2020)
  Barak Bakhar (8 July 2020-)

See also
 Football in Israel

References

External links

 Official website
 Maccabi Haifa Online
 Green Apes
Maccabi Haifa_fans songs

 
Haifa F.C.
Haifa
Football
1913 establishments in the Ottoman Empire
Association football clubs established in 1913